Arsen Grigoryan may refer to:

 Arsen Grigoryan (singer, born 1982), Armenian singer, actor and TV presenter
 Arsen Grigoryan (singer, born 1978), Armenian singer, composer and music producer
 Arsen Grigoryan (singer, born 1968), Syrian-born Armenian traditional songs performer